Berdyuzhsky District  is an administrative district (raion), one of the twenty-two in Tyumen Oblast, Russia. As a municipal division, it is incorporated as Berdyuzhsky Municipal District. It is located in the south of the oblast. Its administrative center is the rural locality (a selo) of Berdyuzhye. Population: 11,490 (2010 Census);  The population of Berdyuzhye accounts for 44.9% of the district's total population.

Geography
Berdyuzhsky District is located in the south of Tyumen Oblast, on the border with Kurgan Oblast, and near the northern border of Kazakhstan.  The terrain is flat upland of forest-steppe landscape.  There are a large number of lakes (256 by one count) in rounded depressions.  The lakes are formed in elongated chains that follow the general course of ancient runoff to the northeast.  A significant portion of the district is agricultural land.  The district is on the eastern extent of the inter-river region of the drainages of the Tobol River (to the west) and the Ishim River (to the east).  The administrative center is the town of Berdyuzhye.  Berdyuzhsky District is 384 km east of the city of Tyumen, 50 km north of the city of Petropavl, Kazakhstan, and 1,800 km east of Moscow.  The area measures 75 km (north-south), 50 km (west-east); total area is 2,800 km2 (about 0.003% of Tyumen Oblast).

The district is bordered on the north by Golyshmanovsky District, on the east by Kazansky District, on the south by Mokrousovsky District of Kurgan Oblast, and on the west by Armizonsky District.

History
Before joining to Russia as part of Siberia, the area was inhabited by Tatars and nomadic herders of southern Turkic peoples.  The first mention of Russian settlement is the building of a string of military strongholds in the late 1600s.  Agricultural settlement followed, mostly farmers from central Russia, and the area records the arrival of conscripts who had been involved in Pugachev's Rebellion in the late 1700s.  150 residents killed during the peasant uprising in the 1920s are buried in a mass grave in the central park of Berdyuzhye.  Berdyuzhsky District was officially formed in July 1923 as part of the Ishimsky district of the Ural Region.

References

Notes

Sources

Districts of Tyumen Oblast